Edmontosaurus (meaning "lizard from Edmonton") is a genus of hadrosaurid (duck-billed) dinosaur. It contains two known species: Edmontosaurus regalis and Edmontosaurus annectens. Fossils of E. regalis have been found in rocks of western North America that date from the late Campanian stage of the Cretaceous Period 73 million years ago, while those of E. annectens were found in the same geographic region but in rocks dated to the end of the Maastrichtian stage of the Cretaceous, 66 million years ago. Edmontosaurus was one of the last non-avian dinosaurs, and lived alongside dinosaurs like Triceratops, Tyrannosaurus, Ankylosaurus, and Pachycephalosaurus shortly before the Cretaceous–Paleogene extinction event. 

Several well-preserved specimens are known that include not only bones, but in some cases extensive skin impressions and possible gut contents. It is classified as a genus of saurolophine (or hadrosaurine) hadrosaurid, a member of the group of hadrosaurids which lacked large, hollow crests, instead having smaller solid crests or fleshy combs.

The first fossils named Edmontosaurus were discovered in southern Alberta (named after Edmonton, the capital city), in the Horseshoe Canyon Formation (formerly called the lower Edmonton Formation). The type species, E. regalis, was named by Lawrence Lambe in 1917, although several other species that are now classified in Edmontosaurus were named earlier. The best known of these is E. annectens, named by Othniel Charles Marsh in 1892; originally as a species of Claosaurus, known for many years as a species of Trachodon, and later as Anatosaurus annectens. Anatosaurus, Anatotitan and probably Ugrunaaluk are now generally regarded as synonyms of Edmontosaurus.

Edmontosaurus was widely distributed across western North America, ranging from Colorado to the north slopes of Alaska. The distribution of Edmontosaurus fossils suggests that it preferred coasts and coastal plains. It was a herbivore that could move on both two legs and four. Because it is known from several bone beds, Edmontosaurus is thought to have lived in groups, and may have been migratory as well. The wealth of fossils has allowed researchers to study its paleobiology in detail, including its brain, how it may have fed, and its injuries and pathologies, such as evidence for tyrannosaur attacks on a few edmontosaur specimens.

Discovery and history

Claosaurus annectens

Edmontosaurus has had a long and complicated history in paleontology, having spent decades with various species classified in other genera. Its taxonomic history intertwines at various points with the genera Agathaumas, Anatosaurus, Anatotitan, Claosaurus, Hadrosaurus, Thespesius, and Trachodon, and references predating the 1980s typically use Anatosaurus, Claosaurus, Thespesius, or Trachodon for edmontosaur fossils (excluding those assigned to E. regalis), depending on author and date. Although Edmontosaurus was only named in 1917, its oldest well-supported species (E. annectens) was named in 1892 as a species of Claosaurus.

The first well-supported species of Edmontosaurus was named in 1892 as Claosaurus annectens by Othniel Charles Marsh. This species is based on USNM 2414, a partial skull-roof and skeleton, with a second skull and skeleton, YPM 2182, designated the paratype. Both were collected in 1891 by John Bell Hatcher from the late Maastrichtian-age Upper Cretaceous Lance Formation of Niobrara County (then part of Converse County), Wyoming. This species has some historical footnotes attached: it is among the first dinosaurs to receive a skeletal restoration, and is the first hadrosaurid so restored; and YPM 2182 and UNSM 2414 are, respectively, the first and second essentially complete mounted dinosaur skeletons in the United States. YPM 2182 was put on display in 1901, and USNM 2414 in 1904.

Because of the incomplete understanding of hadrosaurids at the time, following Marsh's death in 1897 Claosaurus annectens was variously classified as a species of Claosaurus, Thespesius or Trachodon. Opinions varied greatly; textbooks and encyclopedias drew a distinction between the "Iguanodon-like" Claosaurus annectens and the "duck-billed" Hadrosaurus (based on remains now known as adult Edmontosaurus annectens), while Hatcher explicitly identified C. annectens as synonymous with the hadrosaurid represented by those same duck-billed skulls. Hatcher's revision, published in 1902, was sweeping: he considered almost all hadrosaurid genera then known as synonyms of Trachodon.  This included Cionodon, Diclonius, Hadrosaurus, Ornithotarsus, Pteropelyx, and Thespesius, as well as Claorhynchus and Polyonax, fragmentary genera now thought to be horned dinosaurs. Hatcher's work led to a brief consensus, until after 1910 new material from Canada and Montana showed a greater diversity of hadrosaurids than previously suspected. Charles W. Gilmore in 1915 reassessed hadrosaurids and recommended that Thespesius be reintroduced for hadrosaurids from the Lance Formation and rock units of equivalent age, and that Trachodon, based on inadequate material, should be restricted to a hadrosaurid from the older Judith River Formation and its equivalents. In regards to Claosaurus annectens, he recommended that it be considered the same as Thespesius occidentalis. His reinstatement of Thespesius for Lance-age hadrosaurids would have other consequences for the taxonomy of Edmontosaurus in the following decades.

During this time frame (1902–1915), two additional important specimens of C. annectens were recovered. The first, the "mummy" specimen AMNH 5060, was discovered in 1908 by Charles Hazelius Sternberg and his sons in Lance Formation rocks near Lusk, Wyoming. Sternberg was working for the British Museum of Natural History, but Henry Fairfield Osborn of the American Museum of Natural History was able to purchase the specimen for $2,000. The Sternbergs recovered a second similar specimen from the same area in 1910, not as well preserved but also found with skin impressions. They sold this specimen (SM 4036) to the Senckenberg Museum in Germany.

As a side note, Trachodon selwyni, described by Lawrence Lambe in 1902 for a lower jaw from what is now known as the Dinosaur Park Formation of Alberta, was erroneously described by Glut (1997) as having been assigned to Edmontosaurus regalis by Lull and Wright. It was not, instead being designated "of very doubtful validity." More recent reviews of hadrosaurids have concurred.

Canadian discoveries
Edmontosaurus itself was coined in 1917 by Lawrence Lambe for two partial skeletons found in the Horseshoe Canyon Formation (formerly the lower Edmonton Formation) along the Red Deer River of southern Alberta, Canada. These rocks are older than the rocks in which Claosaurus annectens was found. The Edmonton Formation lends Edmontosaurus its name. The type species, E. regalis ("regal", or, more loosely, "king-sized"), is based on NMC 2288, consisting of a skull, articulated vertebrae up to the sixth tail vertebra, ribs, partial hips, an upper arm bone, and most of a hind limb.  It was discovered in 1912 by Levi Sternberg. The second specimen, paratype NMC 2289, consists of a skull and skeleton lacking the beak, most of the tail, and part of the feet.  It was discovered in 1916 by George F. Sternberg. Lambe found that his new dinosaur compared best to Diclonius mirabilis (specimens now assigned to Edmontosaurus annectens), and drew attention to the size and robustness of Edmontosaurus. Initially, Lambe only described the skulls of the two skeletons, but returned to the genus in 1920 to describe the skeleton of NMC 2289. The postcrania of the type specimen remains undescribed, still in its plaster jackets.

Two more species that would come to be included with Edmontosaurus were named from Canadian remains in the 1920s, but both would initially be assigned to Thespesius. Gilmore named the first, Thespesius edmontoni, in 1924. T. edmontoni also came from the Horseshoe Canyon Formation. It was based on NMC 8399, another nearly complete skeleton lacking most of the tail.  NMC 8399 was discovered on the Red Deer River in 1912 by a Sternberg party.  Its forelimbs, ossified tendons, and skin impressions were briefly described in 1913 and 1914 by Lambe, who at first thought it was an example of a species he had named Trachodon marginatus, but then changed his mind. The specimen became the first dinosaur skeleton to be mounted for exhibition in a Canadian museum. Gilmore found that his new species compared closely to what he called Thespesius annectens, but left the two apart because of details of the arms and hands. He also noted that his species had more vertebrae than Marsh's in the back and neck, but proposed that Marsh was mistaken in assuming that the annectens specimens were complete in those regions.

In 1926, Charles Mortram Sternberg named Thespesius saskatchewanensis for NMC 8509, a skull and partial skeleton from the Wood Mountain plateau of southern Saskatchewan. He had collected this specimen in 1921, from rocks that were assigned to the Lance Formation, now the Frenchman Formation. NMC 8509 included an almost complete skull, numerous vertebrae, partial shoulder and hip girdles, and partial hind limbs, representing the first substantial dinosaur specimen recovered from Saskatchewan. Sternberg opted to assign it to Thespesius because that was the only hadrosaurid genus known from the Lance Formation at the time.

Anatosaurus to the present

In 1942, Lull and Wright attempted to resolve the complicated taxonomy of crestless hadrosaurids by naming a new genus, Anatosaurus, to take in several species that did not fit well under their previous genera. Anatosaurus, meaning "duck lizard", because of its wide, duck-like beak (Latin anas = duck + Greek sauros = lizard), had as its type species Marsh's old Claosaurus annectens. Also assigned to this genus were Thespesius edmontoni, T. saskatchewanensis, a large lower jaw that Marsh had named Trachodon longiceps in 1890, and a new species, Anatosaurus copei, for two skeletons on display at the American Museum of Natural History that had long been known as Diclonius mirabilis (or variations thereof). Thus, the various species became Anatosaurus annectens, A. copei, A. edmontoni, A. longiceps, and A. saskatchewanensis. Anatosaurus would come to be called the "classic duck-billed dinosaur."

This state of affairs persisted for several decades, until Michael K. Brett-Surman reexamined the pertinent material for his graduate studies in the 1970s and 1980s. He concluded that the type species of Anatosaurus, A. annectens, was actually a species of Edmontosaurus and that A. copei was different enough to warrant its own genus. Although theses and dissertations are not regarded as official publications by the International Commission on Zoological Nomenclature, which regulates the naming of organisms, his conclusions were known to other paleontologists, and were adopted by several popular works of the time. Brett-Surman and Ralph Chapman designated a new genus for A. copei (Anatotitan) in 1990. Of the remaining species, A. saskatchewanensis and A. edmontoni were assigned to Edmontosaurus as well, and A. longiceps went to Anatotitan, as either a second species or as a synonym of A. copei. Because the type species of Anatosaurus (A. annectens) was sunk into Edmontosaurus, the name Anatosaurus is abandoned as a junior synonym of Edmontosaurus.
 
The conception of Edmontosaurus that emerged included three valid species: the type E. regalis, E. annectens (including Anatosaurus edmontoni, amended to edmontonensis), and E. saskatchewanensis. The debate about the proper taxonomy of the A. copei specimens continues to the present: returning to Hatcher's argument of 1902, Jack Horner, David B. Weishampel, and Catherine Forster regarded Anatotitan copei as representing specimens of Edmontosaurus annectens with crushed skulls. In 2007 another "mummy" was announced; nicknamed "Dakota", it was discovered in 1999 by Tyler Lyson, and came from the Hell Creek Formation of North Dakota.

In a 2011 study by Nicolás Campione and David Evans, the authors conducted the first ever morphometric analysis to compare the various specimens assigned to Edmontosaurus. They concluded that only two species are valid: E. regalis, from the late Campanian, and E. annectens, from the late Maastrichtian. Their study provided further evidence that Anatotitan copei is a synonym of E. annectens; specifically, that the long, low skull of A. copei is the result of ontogenetic change and represents mature E. annectens individuals.

Species and distribution
 
Edmontosaurus is currently regarded as having two valid species: type species E. regalis, and E. annectens. E. regalis is known only from the Horseshoe Canyon Formation of Alberta, dating from the late Campanian stage of the late Cretaceous period. At least a dozen individuals are known, including seven skulls with associated postcrania, and five to seven other skulls. The species formerly known as Thespesius edmontoni or Anatosaurus edmontoni represents immature individuals.

E. annectens is known from the Frenchman Formation of Saskatchewan, the Hell Creek Formation of Montana, and the Lance Formation of South Dakota and Wyoming. It is limited to late Maastrichtian rocks, and is represented by at least twenty skulls, some with postcranial remains. One author, Kraig Derstler, has described E. annectens as "perhaps the most perfectly-known dinosaur to date [1994]." Anatosaurus copei and E. saskatchewanensis are now thought to be growth stages of E. annectens: A. copei as adults, and E. saskatchewanensis as juveniles. Trachodon longiceps may be a synonym of E. annectens as well. Anatosaurus edmontoni was mistakenly listed as a synonym of E. annectens in both reviews of the Dinosauria, but this does not appear to be the case.

E. annectens differed from E. regalis by having a longer, lower, less robust skull. Although Brett-Surman regarded E. regalis and E. annectens as potentially representing males and females of the same species, all E. regalis specimens come from older formations than E. annectens specimens. Edmontosaurine specimens from the Prince Creek Formation of Alaska formerly assigned to Edmontosaurus sp. were given their own genus and species name, Ugrunaaluk kuukpikensis, in 2015. However, the identification of Ugrunaaluk as a separate genus was questioned by a 2017 study from Hai Xing and colleagues, who regarded it as a nomen dubium indistinguishable from other Edmontosaurus. In 2020, Ryuji Takasaki and colleagues agreed that the Prince Creek remains should be classified as Edmontosaurus, though species designation is unclear as the specimens are juveniles. Edmontosaurus was also reported from the Javelina Formation of Big Bend National Park, western Texas based on TMM 41442-1, but was later referred to Kritosaurus cf. navajovius by Wagner (2001), before being assigned to Kritosaurus sp. by Lehman et al. (2016).

Description
Edmontosaurus has been described in detail from numerous specimens. Traditionally, E. regalis has been regarded as the largest species, though this was challenged by the hypothesis that the larger hadrosaurid Anatotitan copei is a synonym of Edmontosaurus annectens, as put forward by Jack Horner and colleagues in 2004, and supported in studies by Campione and Evans in 2011.

Size

Edmontosaurus was among the largest hadrosaurids. Like other hadrosaurids, it was a bulky animal with a long, laterally flattened tail and a head with an expanded, duck-like beak.

E. annectens is often seen as smaller. Two specimens still under study in the collection of the Museum of the Rockies - a  tail labelled as MOR 1142 and another labelled as MOR 1609 - indicate that Edmontosaurus annectens could have grown to larger sizes, possibly rivaling Shantungosaurus in size.

Skull

The skull of a fully grown Edmontosaurus could be over a metre long. The skull was roughly triangular in profile, with no bony cranial crest. Viewed from above, the front and rear of the skull were expanded, with the broad front forming a duck-bill or spoon-bill shape. The beak was toothless, and both the upper and lower beaks were extended by keratinous material. Substantial remains of the keratinous upper beak are known from the "mummy" kept at the Senckenberg Museum. In this specimen, the preserved nonbony part of the beak extended for at least  beyond the bone, projecting down vertically. The nasal openings of Edmontosaurus were elongate and housed in deep depressions surrounded by distinct bony rims above, behind, and below.

In at least one case (the Senckenberg specimen), rarely preserved sclerotic rings were preserved in the eye sockets. Another rarely seen bone, the stapes (the reptilian ear bone), has also been seen in a specimen of Edmontosaurus.

Teeth were present only in the maxillae (upper cheeks) and dentaries (main bone of the lower jaw). The teeth were continually replaced, taking about half a year to form. They were composed of six types of tissues, rivaling the complexity of mammal teeth. They grew in columns, with an observed maximum of six in each, and the number of columns varied based on the animal's size. Known column counts for the two species are: 51 to 53 columns per maxilla and 48 to 49 per dentary (teeth of the upper jaw being slightly narrower than those in the lower jaw) for E. regalis; and 52 columns per maxilla and 44 per dentary for E. annectens (an E. saskatchewanensis specimen).

Postcranial skeleton

The number of vertebrae differs between specimens.  E. regalis had thirteen neck vertebrae, eighteen back vertebrae, nine hip vertebrae, and an unknown number of tail vertebrae.  A specimen once identified as belonging to Anatosaurus edmontoni (now considered to be the same as E. regalis) is reported as having an additional back vertebra and 85 tail vertebrae, with an undisclosed amount of restoration. Other hadrosaurids are only reported as having 50 to 70 tail vertebrae, so this appears to have been an overestimate. The anterior back was curved toward the ground, with the neck flexed upward and the rest of the back and tail held horizontally. Most of the back and tail were lined by ossified tendons arranged in a latticework along the neural spines of the vertebrae. This condition has been described as making the back and at least part of the tail "ramrod" straight. The ossified tendons are interpreted as having strengthened the vertebral column against gravitational stress, incurred through being a large animal with a horizontal vertebral column otherwise supported mostly by the hind legs and hips.

The shoulder blades were long flat blade-like bones, held roughly parallel to the vertebral column. The hips were composed of three elements each: an elongate ilium above the articulation with the leg, an ischium below and behind with a long thin rod, and a pubis in front that flared into a plate-like structure. The structure of the hip hindered the animal from standing with its back erect, because in such a position the thigh bone would have pushed against the joint of the ilium and pubis, instead of pushing only against the solid ilium.  The nine fused hip vertebrae provided support for the hip.

The fore legs were shorter and less heavily built than the hind legs. The upper arm had a large deltopectoral crest for muscle attachment, while the ulna and radius were slim. The upper arm and forearm were similar in length. The wrist was simple, with only two small bones. Each hand had four fingers, with no thumb (first finger). The index (second), third, and fourth fingers were approximately the same length and were united in life within a fleshy covering. Although the second and third finger had hoof-like unguals, these bones were also within the skin and not apparent from the outside. The little finger diverged from the other three and was much shorter. The thigh bone was robust and straight, with a prominent flange about halfway down the posterior side. This ridge was for the attachment of powerful muscles attached to the hips and tail that pulled the thighs (and thus the hind legs) backward and helped maintain the use of the tail as a balancing organ.  Each foot had three toes, with no big toe or little toe. The toes had hoof-like tips.

Soft tissue

Multiple specimens of Edmontosaurus annectens have been found with preserved skin impressions. Several have been well-publicized, such as the "Trachodon mummy" of the early 20th century, and the specimen nicknamed "Dakota", the latter apparently including remnant organic compounds from the skin. Because of these finds, the scalation of Edmontosaurus annectens is known for most areas of the body. Skin impressions are less well known for E. regalis, but some well-preserved examples have been studied, including one which preserves a soft tissue crest or wattle on the head. It is unknown whether such a crest was present on E. annectens, and whether it was an indicator of sexual dimorphism.

A preserved rhamphotheca present in the E. annectens specimen LACM 23502, housed in the Los Angeles County Museum, indicates the beak of Edmontosaurus was more hook-shaped and extensive than many illustrations in scientific and public media have previously depicted. Whether or not the specimen in question preserved the true rhamphotheca or just a cast of the inner structure attached to the bone is not known at present.

Classification

Edmontosaurus was a hadrosaurid (a duck-billed dinosaur), a member of a family of dinosaurs which to date are known only from the Late Cretaceous. It is classified within the Saurolophinae (alternately Hadrosaurinae), a clade of hadrosaurids which lacked hollow crests. Other members of the group include Brachylophosaurus, Gryposaurus, Lophorhothon, Maiasaura, Naashoibitosaurus, Prosaurolophus, and Saurolophus. It was either closely related to or includes the species Anatosaurus annectens (alternately Edmontosaurus annectens), a large hadrosaurid from various latest Cretaceous formations of western North America. The giant Chinese hadrosaurine Shantungosaurus giganteus is also anatomically similar to Edmontosaurus; M. K. Brett-Surman found the two to differ only in details related to the greater size of Shantungosaurus, based on what had been described of the latter genus.

While the status of Edmontosaurus as a saurolophine has not been challenged, its exact placement within the clade is uncertain.  Early phylogenies, such as that presented in R. S. Lull and Nelda Wright's influential 1942 monograph, had Edmontosaurus and various species of Anatosaurus (most of which would be later considered as additional species or specimens of Edmontosaurus) as one lineage among several lineages of "flat-headed" hadrosaurs. One of the first analyses using cladistic methods found it to be linked with Anatosaurus (=Anatotitan) and Shantungosaurus in an informal "edmontosaur" clade, which was paired with the spike-crested "saurolophs" and more distantly related to the "brachylophosaurs" and arch-snouted "gryposaurs". A 2007 study by Terry Gates and Scott Sampson found broadly similar results, in that Edmontosaurus remained close to Saurolophus and Prosaurolophus and distant from Gryposaurus, Brachylophosaurus, and Maiasaura. However, the most recent review of Hadrosauridae, by Jack Horner and colleagues (2004), came to a noticeably different result: Edmontosaurus was nested between Gryposaurus and the "brachylophosaurs", and distant from Saurolophus.

Left cladogram per Horner et al. (2004), right cladogram per Gates and Sampson (2007).

Paleobiology

Diet and feeding

As a hadrosaurid, Edmontosaurus was a large terrestrial herbivore. Its teeth were continually replaced and packed into dental batteries that contained hundreds of teeth, only a relative handful of which were in use at any time. It used its broad beak to cut loose food, perhaps by cropping, or by closing the jaws in a clamshell-like manner over twigs and branches and then stripping off the more nutritious leaves and shoots. Because the tooth rows are deeply indented from the outside of the jaws, and because of other anatomical details, it is inferred that Edmontosaurus and most other ornithischians had cheek-like structures, muscular or non-muscular. The function of the cheeks was to retain food in the mouth.

Before the 1960s and 1970s, the prevailing interpretation of hadrosaurids like Edmontosaurus was that they were aquatic and fed on aquatic plants. An example of this is William Morris's 1970 interpretation of an edmontosaur skull with nonbony beak remnants. He proposed that the animal had a diet much like that of some modern ducks, filtering plants and aquatic invertebrates like mollusks and crustaceans from the water and discharging water via V-shaped furrows along the inner face of the upper beak. This interpretation of the beak has been rejected, as the furrows and ridges are more like those of herbivorous turtle beaks than the flexible structures seen in filter-feeding birds.

Because scratches dominate the microwear texture of the teeth, Williams et al. suggested Edmontosaurus was a grazer instead of a browser, which would be predicted to have fewer scratches due to eating less abrasive materials. Candidates for ingested abrasives include silica-rich plants like horsetails and soil that was accidentally ingested due to feeding at ground level. The tooth structure indicates combined slicing and grinding capabilities.

Reports of gastroliths, or stomach stones, in the hadrosaurid Claosaurus is actually based on a probable double misidentification. First, the specimen is actually of Edmontosaurus annectens.  Barnum Brown, who discovered the specimen in 1900, referred to it as Claosaurus because E. annectens was thought to be a species of Claosaurus at the time. Additionally, it is more likely that the supposed gastroliths represent gravel washed in during burial.

Gut contents

Both of the "mummy" specimens collected by the Sternbergs were reported to have had possible gut contents. Charles H. Sternberg reported the presence of carbonized gut contents in the American Museum of Natural History specimen, but this material has not been described. The plant remains in the Senckenberg Museum specimen have been described, but have proven difficult to interpret.  The plants found in the carcass included needles of the conifer Cunninghamites elegans, twigs from conifer and broadleaf trees, and numerous small seeds or fruits. Upon their description in 1922, they were the subject of a debate in the German-language journal Paläontologische Zeitschrift. Kräusel, who described the material, interpreted it as the gut contents of the animal, while Abel could not rule out that the plants had been washed into the carcass after death.

At the time, hadrosaurids were thought to have been aquatic animals, and Kräusel made a point of stating that the specimen did not rule out hadrosaurids eating water plants. The discovery of possible gut contents made little impact in English-speaking circles, except for another brief mention of the aquatic-terrestrial dichotomy, until it was brought up by John Ostrom in the course of an article reassessing the old interpretation of hadrosaurids as water-bound. Instead of trying to adapt the discovery to the aquatic model, he used it as a line of evidence that hadrosaurids were terrestrial herbivores. While his interpretation of hadrosaurids as terrestrial animals has been generally accepted, the Senckenberg plant fossils remain equivocal. Kenneth Carpenter has suggested that they may actually represent the gut contents of a starving animal, instead of a typical diet. Other authors have noted that because the plant fossils were removed from their original context in the specimen and were heavily prepared, it is no longer possible to follow up on the original work, leaving open the possibility that the plants were washed-in debris.

Isotopic studies

The diet and physiology of Edmontosaurus have been probed by using stable isotopes of carbon and oxygen as recorded in tooth enamel. When feeding, drinking, and breathing, animals take in carbon and oxygen, which become incorporated into bone. The isotopes of these two elements are determined by various internal and external factors, such as the type of plants being eaten, the physiology of the animal, salinity, and climate. If isotope ratios in fossils are not altered by fossilization and later changes, they can be studied for information about the original factors; warmblooded animals will have certain isotopic compositions compared to their surroundings, animals that eat certain types of plants or use certain digestive processes will have distinct isotopic compositions, and so on. Enamel is typically used because the structure of the mineral that forms enamel makes it the most resistant material to chemical change in the skeleton.

A 2004 study by Kathryn Thomas and Sandra Carlson used teeth from the upper jaw of three individuals interpreted as a juvenile, a subadult, and an adult, recovered from a bone bed in the Hell Creek Formation of Corson County, South Dakota. In this study, successive teeth in columns in the edmontosaurs' dental batteries were sampled from multiple locations along each tooth using a microdrilling system. This sampling method takes advantage of the organization of hadrosaurid dental batteries to find variation in tooth isotopes over a period of time. From their work, it appears that edmontosaur teeth took less than about 0.65 years to form, slightly faster in younger edmontosaurs. The teeth of all three individuals appeared to show variation in oxygen isotope ratios that could correspond to warm/dry and cool/wet periods; Thomas and Carlson considered the possibility that the animals were migrating instead, but favored local seasonal variations because migration would have more likely led to ratio homogenization, as many animals migrate to stay within specific temperature ranges or near particular food sources.

The edmontosaurs also showed enriched carbon isotope values, which for modern mammals would be interpreted as a mixed diet of C3 plants (most plants) and C4 plants (grasses); however, C4 plants were extremely rare in the Late Cretaceous if present at all. Thomas and Carlson put forward several factors that may have been operating, and found the most likely to include a diet heavy in gymnosperms, consuming salt-stressed plants from coastal areas adjacent to the Western Interior Seaway, and a physiological difference between dinosaurs and mammals that caused dinosaurs to form tissue with different carbon ratios than would be expected for mammals. A combination of factors is also possible.

Chewing

Between the mid-1980s and the 2000s, the prevailing interpretation of how hadrosaurids processed their food followed the model put forward in 1984 by David B. Weishampel. He proposed that the structure of the skull permitted motion between bones that resulted in backward and forward motion of the lower jaw, and outward bowing of the tooth-bearing bones of the upper jaw when the mouth was closed. The teeth of the upper jaw would grind against the teeth of the lower jaw like rasps, processing plant material trapped between them. Such a motion would parallel the effects of mastication in mammals, although accomplishing the effects in a completely different way. Work in the early 2000s has challenged the Weishampel model. A study published in 2008 by Casey Holliday and Lawrence Witmer found that ornithopods like Edmontosaurus lacked the types of skull joints seen in those modern animals that are known to have kinetic skulls (skulls that permit motion between their constituent bones), such as squamates and birds. They proposed that joints that had been interpreted as permitting movement in dinosaur skulls were actually cartilaginous growth zones. An important piece of evidence for Weishampel's model is the orientation of scratches on the teeth, showing the direction of jaw action. Other movements could produce similar scratches though, such as movement of the bones of the two halves of the lower jaw. Not all models have been scrutinized under present techniques. Vincent Williams and colleagues (2009) published additional work on hadrosaurid tooth microwear. They found four classes of scratches on Edmontosaurus teeth. The most common class was interpreted as resulting from an oblique motion, not a simple up-down or front-back motion, which is consistent with the Weishampel model. This motion is thought to have been the primary motion for grinding food. Two scratch classes were interpreted as resulting from forward or backward movement of the jaws. The other class was variable and probably resulted from opening the jaws. The combination of movements is more complex than had been previously predicted.
 
Weishampel developed his model with the aid of a computer simulation. Natalia Rybczynski and colleagues have updated this work with a much more sophisticated three-dimensional animation model, scanning a skull of E. regalis with lasers. Rybczynski and colleagues were not convinced that the Weishampel model is viable, but noted that they have several improvements to implement to their animation. Planned improvements include incorporating soft tissue and tooth wear marks and scratches, which should better constrain movements. They note that there are several other hypotheses to test as well. Further research published in 2012 by Robin Cuthbertson and colleagues found the motions required for Weishampel's model to be unlikely, and favored a model in which movements of the lower jaw produced grinding action. The lower jaw's joint with the upper jaw would permit anterior–posterior motion along with the usual rotation, and the anterior joint of the two halves of the lower jaw would also permit motion; in combination, the two halves of the lower jaw could move slightly back and forth as well as rotating slightly along their long axes. These motions would account for the observed tooth wear and a more solidly constructed skull than modeled by Weishampel.

Growth

In a 2011 study, Campione and Evans recorded data from all known "edmontosaur" skulls from the Campanian and Maastrichtian and used it to plot a morphometric graph, comparing variable features of the skull with skull size. Their results showed that within both recognized Edmontosaurus species, many features previously used to classify additional species or genera were directly correlated with skull size. Campione and Evans interpreted these results as strongly suggesting that the shape of Edmontosaurus skulls changed dramatically as they grew. This has led to several apparent mistakes in classification in the past. The Campanian species Thespesius edmontoni, previously considered a synonym of E. annectens due to its small size and skull shape, is more likely a subadult specimen of the contemporary E. regalis. Similarly, the three previously recognized Maastrichtian edmontosaur species likely represent growth stages of a single species, with E. saskatchewanensis representing juveniles, E. annectens subadults, and Anatotitan copei fully mature adults. The skulls became longer and flatter as the animals grew.

In a 2014 study, researchers proposed that E. regalis reached maturity in 10-15 years of age. In a 2022 study, Wosik and Evans proposed that E. annectens reached maturity in 9 years of age based on their analysis for various specimens from different loaclities. They found the result to be similar to that of other hadrosaurs.

Brain and nervous system

The brain of Edmontosaurus has been described in several papers and abstracts through the use of endocasts of the cavity where the brain had been. E. annectens and E. regalis, as well as specimens not identified to species, have been studied in this way. The brain was not particularly large for an animal the size of Edmontosaurus. The brain was an elongate structure, and as with other non-mammals, there would have been no neocortex. Like Stegosaurus, the neural canal was expanded in the hips, but not to the same degree: the endosacral space of Stegosaurus had 20 times the volume of its endocranial cast, whereas the endosacral space of Edmontosaurus was only 2.59 times larger in volume.

Pathologies and health

In 2003, evidence of tumors, including hemangiomas, desmoplastic fibroma, metastatic cancer, and osteoblastoma, was described in Edmontosaurus bones. Rothschild et al. tested dinosaur vertebrae for tumors using computerized tomography and fluoroscope screening. Several other hadrosaurids, including Brachylophosaurus, Gilmoreosaurus, and Bactrosaurus, also tested positive. Although more than 10,000 fossils were examined in this manner, the tumors were limited to Edmontosaurus and closely related genera. The tumors may have been caused by environmental factors or genetic propensity.

Osteochondrosis, or surficial pits in bone at places where bones articulate, is also known in Edmontosaurus. This condition, resulting from cartilage failing to be replaced by bone during growth, was found to be present in 2.2% of 224 edmontosaur toe bones. The underlying cause of the condition is unknown. Genetic predisposition, trauma, feeding intensity, alterations in blood supply, excess thyroid hormones, and deficiencies in various growth factors have been suggested. Among dinosaurs, osteochondrosis (like tumors) is most commonly found in hadrosaurids.

Locomotion

Like other hadrosaurids, Edmontosaurus is thought to have been a facultative biped, meaning that it mostly moved on four legs, but could adopt a bipedal stance when needed. It probably went on all fours when standing still or moving slowly, and switched to using the hind legs alone when moving more rapidly. Further simulations using a subadult specimen estimated as weighing  when alive produced a model that could run or hop bipedally, use a trot, pace, or single foot symmetric quadrupedal gait, or move at a gallop. The researchers found to their surprise that the fastest gait was kangaroo-like hopping (maximum simulated speed of ), which they regarded as unlikely based on the size of the animal and lack of hopping footprints in the fossil record, and instead interpreted the result as indicative of an inaccuracy in their simulation. The fastest non-hopping gaits were  galloping (maximum simulated speed of ) and running bipedally (maximum simulated speed of ). They found weak support for bipedal running as the most likely option for high-speed movement, but did not rule out high-speed quadrupedal movement.

While long thought to have been aquatic or semiaquatic, hadrosaurids were not as well-suited for swimming as other dinosaurs (particularly theropods, who were once thought to have been unable to pursue hadrosaurids into water). Hadrosaurids had slim hands with short fingers, making their forelimbs ineffective for propulsion, and the tail was also not useful for propulsion because of the ossified tendons that increased its rigidity, and the poorly developed attachment points for muscles that would have moved the tail from side to side.

Social behavior
Extensive bone beds are known for Edmontosaurus, and such groupings of hadrosaurids are used to suggest that they were gregarious, living in groups. Three quarries containing Edmontosaurus remains are identified in a 2007 database of fossil bone beds, from Alberta (Horseshoe Canyon Formation), South Dakota (Hell Creek Formation), and Wyoming (Lance Formation). One edmontosaur bone bed, from claystone and mudstone of the Lance Formation in eastern Wyoming, covers more than a square kilometre, although Edmontosaurus bones are most concentrated in a  subsection of this site. It is estimated that disassociated remains pertaining to 10,000 to 25,000 edmontosaurs are present here.

Unlike many other hadrosaurids, Edmontosaurus lacked a bony crest. It may have had soft-tissue display structures in the skull, though: the bones around the nasal openings had deep indentations surrounding the openings, and this pair of recesses are postulated to have held inflatable air sacs, perhaps allowing for both visual and auditory signaling. Edmontosaurus may have been dimorphic, with more robust and more lightly built forms, but it has not been established if this is related to sexual dimorphism.

Edmontosaurus has been considered a possibly migratory hadrosaurid by some authors. A 2008 review of dinosaur migration studies by Phil R. Bell and Eric Snively proposed that E. regalis was capable of an annual  round-trip journey, provided it had the requisite metabolism and fat deposition rates. In contrast to Bell and Snively, Anusuya Chinsamy and colleagues concluded from a study of bone microstructure that polar Edmontosaurus overwintered.

Paleoecology

Distribution

Edmontosaurus was a wide-ranging genus in both time and space. At the southern range of its distribution, the rock units from which it is known can be divided into two groups by age: the older Horseshoe Canyon and St. Mary River formations, and the younger Frenchman, Hell Creek, and Lance formations. The time span covered by the Horseshoe Canyon Formation and equivalents is also known as Edmontonian, and the time span covered by the younger units is also known as Lancian. The Edmontonian and Lancian time intervals had distinct dinosaur faunas. At its northern range, Edmontosaurus is known from a single locality; the Liscomb Bonebed of the Prince Creek Formation. 

The Edmontonian land vertebrate age is defined by the first appearance of Edmontosaurus regalis in the fossil record. Although sometimes reported as of exclusively early Maastrichtian age, the Horseshoe Canyon Formation was of somewhat longer duration. Deposition began approximately 73 million years ago, in the late Campanian, and ended between 68.0 and 67.6 million years ago. Edmontosaurus regalis is known from the lowest of five units within the Horseshoe Canyon Formation, but is absent from at least the second to the top. As many as three quarters of the dinosaur specimens from badlands near Drumheller, Alberta may pertain to Edmontosaurus.

Ecosystem

The Lancian time interval was the last interval before the Cretaceous–Paleogene extinction event that eliminated non-avian dinosaurs. Edmontosaurus was one of the more common dinosaurs of the interval. Robert Bakker reports that it made up one-seventh of the large dinosaur sample, with most of the rest (five-sixths) made up of the horned dinosaur Triceratops. The coastal plain Triceratops–Edmontosaurus association, dominated by Triceratops, extended from Colorado to Saskatchewan.

It was closer to a large delta than the Hell Creek Formation depositional setting to the north and received much more sediment. Tropical araucarian conifers and palm trees dotted the hardwood forests, differentiating the flora from the northern coastal plain. The climate was humid and subtropical, with conifers, palmettos, and ferns in the swamps, and conifers, ash, live oak, and shrubs in the forests. Freshwater fish, salamanders, turtles, diverse lizards, snakes, shorebirds, and small mammals lived alongside the dinosaurs. Small dinosaurs are not known in as great of abundance here as in the Hell Creek rocks, but Thescelosaurus once again seems to have been relatively common. Triceratops is known from many skulls, which tend to be somewhat smaller than those of more northern individuals. The Lance Formation is the setting of two edmontosaur "mummies".

Predator-prey relationships

The time span and geographic range of Edmontosaurus overlapped with Tyrannosaurus, and an adult specimen of E. annectens on display in the Denver Museum of Nature and Science shows evidence of a theropod bite in the tail. Counting back from the hip, the thirteenth to seventeenth vertebrae have damaged spines consistent with an attack from the right rear of the animal. One spine has a portion sheared away, and the others are kinked; three have apparent tooth puncture marks. The bones are partially healed, but the edmontosaur died before the traces of damage were completely obliterated. The damage also shows signs of bone infection. Kenneth Carpenter, who studied the specimen, noted that there also seems to be a healed fracture in the left hip which predated the attack because it was more fully healed. He suggested that the edmontosaur was a target because it may have been limping from this earlier injury. Because it survived the attack, Carpenter suggested that it may have outmaneuvered or outrun its attacker, or that the damage to its tail was incurred by the hadrosaurid using it as a weapon against the tyrannosaur. However, more modern studies dispute the idea of an attack but rather other factors unrelated to an attack from a tyrannosaur.

Some of the marks are partially healed. Michael Triebold, informally reporting on the specimen, suggested a scenario where small theropods attacked the throat of the edmontosaur; the animal survived the initial attack but succumbed to its injuries shortly thereafter. Some edmontosaur bone beds were sites of scavenging. Albertosaurus and Saurornitholestes tooth marks are common at one Alberta bone bed, and Daspletosaurus fed on Edmontosaurus and fellow hadrosaurid Saurolophus at another Alberta site.

See also
Timeline of hadrosaur research

References

External links

Late Cretaceous dinosaurs of North America
Saurolophines
Featured articles
Campanian genus first appearances
Maastrichtian genus extinctions
Maastrichtian life
Fossil taxa described in 1917
Taxa named by Lawrence Lambe
Lance fauna
Hell Creek fauna
Laramie Formation
Paleontology in Alberta
Ornithischian genera